The Coordination of Parties of the Majority is an alliance of parties supporting the President of Mauritania Mohamed Ould Ghazouani. It was founded on 20 April 2021.

History

The alliance was founded on 20 April 2021 by 13 parliamentary and extra-parliamentary political parties that form part of the presidential majority supporting president Mohamed Ould Ghazouani. The parties expressed  their "strong support for the program of President Mohamed Ould Cheikh El Ghazouani and his government" and pledged "to dedicate their efforts to work on implementing" Ghazouani's election program. The coordination "works to unify visions on various national and political issues, according to a clear and consistent mechanism that respects the controls of democracy, political partnership, and the privacy of each of the parties" members of the coalition. The coordination also criticised the legacy of Mauritanian ex-president Mohamed Ould Abdel Aziz and Aziz's alleged "desperate attempt to divert attention from the accusations leveled against him" and his "politicization of a judicial case".

On 2 August 2022, the coalition held a meeting to evaluate the framework of the coordination, commemorate the third anniversary of the investiture of Ghazouani and exchange views on the organisation of the upcoming elections.

On 5 October 2022, Union for Planning and Construction (UPC), left the coalition in order to form a coalition with four political movements that weren't allowed to be registered as political parties, forming the State of Justice Coalition, which would run under the UPC party label.

Composition
On 2 August 2022, the alliance consisted of 14 parties.

See also
 First government of Mohamed Ould Bilal
 Second government of Mohamed Ould Bilal
 State of Justice Coalition
 Hope Mauritania

Footnotes

References

Political party alliances in Mauritania
Political parties established in 2021